Stéphane Tétreault (born 10 April 1993) is a Canadian cellist. He first made international headlines as the recipient of Bernard Greenhouse's cello, the 1707 "Countess of Stainlein, Ex-Paganini" Stradivarius, generously loaned to him by Mrs. Jacqueline Desmarais and following her passing by her daughter Mrs. Sophie Desmarais.

Critics 
Stéphane Tétreault has garnered great praise from the world's leading music critics: "Tétreault’s disc charmed me from the off; this is just pure, lyrical, unadulterated playing of the highest order, with a maturity that belies his 22 years... I can’t wait to hear more from him." (Charlotte Gardner, Gramophone), "His vibrato and tone are varied, his bowing techniques immaculate and his awareness of harmony and consequent shading omnipresent." (Joanne Talbot, The Strad), "The solo playing is astonishingly mature not merely in its technical attributes but also in its warmth, brilliance and subtlety of colour and inflection." (Geoffrey Norris, Gramophone).

Awards and recognition 

 2022 - Prix Opus - Performer of the Year - CQM - Conseil québécois de la musique
 2019 - Virginia Parker Prize (Canada Council for the Arts)
 2018 - Maureen Forrester Next Generation Award from Stratford Summer Music Festival
 2015 - Career Development Award from the Women’s Musical Club of Toronto
 2014 - Fernand-Lindsay Career Development Award from the Fondation Père Lindsay
 2014 - Sylva Gelber Music Foundation Award
 2013 - Choquette-Symcox Award conferred by JM Canada Foundation and Jeunesses Musicales Canada
 2012 - New Artist of the Year Award at the 16th Annual Gala des prix Opus
 2012 - Révélation Radio-Canada in Classical Music
 2012 - Hnatyshyn Foundation Award
 2007 - First Prize Winner – Montreal Symphony Orchestra OSM/Standard Life Competition

Recordings 

 2022 - Suite Tango - Works for Cello and Bandoneon from composer and bandoneonist Denis Plante; Inspired by the  unaccompanied cello suites by J. S. Bach - ATMA Classique
 2022 - Transfiguration - Works for Cello and Harp from Marjan Mozetich; Caroline Lizotte, Alexandre Grogg, Kelly-Marie Murphy and François Vallières; Valérie Milot - ATMA Classique
 2017 - Trio for Violin, Cello and Harp - Henriette Renié, Jacques Ibert, Halvorsen and Schubert; Valérie Milot, Antoine Bareil; Groupe Analekta
 2015 - Work for Cello and Piano - Haydn, Schubert, Brahms; Marie-Ève Scarfone; Groupe Analekta
 2014 - Bookburners - Work for Cello and Turntable; Nicole Lizée; DJ P-Love (Paolo Kapunan); Bande à part (Radio-Canada); Centrediscs
 2013 - Par Amour Pour Philou - Improvisation nocturne pour Philou; François Dompierre; Justin Time Records
 2012 - Saint-Saëns & Tchaikovsky - Concertos for Cello and Orchestra; Orchestre symphonique de Québec; Fabien Gabel; Groupe Analekta

References

External links 
 Official Website

1993 births
Living people
Canadian classical cellists
Université de Montréal alumni
Musicians from Montreal